Joelle Cortis (born 28 March 1987) is a Maltese long-distance runner. In 2020, she competed in the women's half marathon at the 2020 World Athletics Half Marathon Championships held in Gdynia, Poland.

References

External links 
 

Living people
1987 births
Place of birth missing (living people)
Maltese female long-distance runners
Maltese female marathon runners